Arlette Elkaïm-Sartre (1935 - 16 September 2016) was a French translator and editor, adopted by the writer Jean-Paul Sartre in 1964.

Life 
Born in Constantine, an editor, she worked on the reports of the Russell Tribunal in the late 1960s.

In 1956, at age nineteen, she met Sartre.  They had a brief affair. In 1965, he adopted her as his daughter.

In 1980, upon Sartre's death, she became his universal legatee.

She initiated and led the movement for the critical re-editing and posthumous publication of Sartre's work, which began in 1985 with the publication of the two volumes of the Critique of Dialectical Reason. She prefaced works by Sartre. 
 
She translated and annotated the Aggadoth of the  - Ein Yaakov (preceded by an Introduction to Talmudic Literature, by Marc-Alain Ouaknin, published by Verdier, series "Les dix paroles", Lagrasse, 1982, re-edited 1990, 1450 pp.).

She has also translated for the theatre Oedipus at Colonus, a tragedy by Sophocles, performed in 2006 at the Varia theatre in Brussels in a production by Vincent Sornaga.

In 2010, she undertook the enlarged and revised edition of the book Situations.

Elkaïm died in Paris. She is buried at the cimetière du Montparnasse.

Publications 
Prefaces to the works of J.-P. Sartre
  ("Bibliothèque de philosophie", Éditions Gallimard, 1983).
 Critique de la raison dialectique (New edition with glossary, Gallimard, 1985).
 Mallarmé, la lucidité et sa face d’ombre (Presentation and notes, Arcades, Gallimard, 1986).
  (Bibliothèque de philosophie, new, revised and expanded edition, Gallimard, 1988).
 Vérité et existence (NRF essais, Gallimard, 1989).
 La Reine Albemarle ou le dernier touriste (Gallimard, 1991).
  (New edition increased by a new notebook, Gallimard, 1995). Further notes for this same work in Les Mots and other autobiographical writings. Bibliothèque de la Pléiade, Gallimard 2010.
 L'existentialisme est un humanisme (Folio essais, Gallimard, 1996).
 The Imaginary. Psychologie phénoménologique de l’imagination  (Folio essais, new edition Gallimard, 2005).
 Anti-Semite and Jew (new édition, 2005).
 Typhus (Scénario, Gallimard, 2007).
 What Is Literature? (Nouvelle édition, Gallimard, 2009).

Notices and notes for a new edition of Situations 
 Situations, I, (New enlarged edition, presentation, notices and notes, Gallimard, 2010).
 , (New enlarged edition, presentation, notices and notes, Gallimard, 2012).
 , (New enlarged edition, presentation, notices and notes, Gallimard, 2013).
 Situations, IV, (New enlarged edition, presentation, notices and notes, Gallimard, 2015).
 Situations, V, (New enlarged edition, presentation, notices and notes, Gallimard, 2018).

Short stories
 Fêtes de nuit (Les Temps modernes n° 155, January 1959)
 Rayon fillettes (Les Temps modernes n° 203, April 1963).
 Le retour au pays (Les Temps modernes n° 215, April 1964).
 Dans le temps (Obliques, 1st quarter 1981).

Articles
 À propos Les Bonnes Femmes (Les Temps modernes n°173-174, August–September 1960).
 L'Avventura (Les Temps modernes n° 178, February 1961).
 Brassens à l’Olympia Les Temps Modernes n° 187, December 1961).
 The Connexion (Les Temps modernes n° 191, April 1962).
 Du cinéma considéré comme un assassinat (Les Temps modernes n° 199, December 1962).
 The Exterminating Angel (Les Temps modernes n° 206, July  1963).
 about 8½ (Les Temps modernes n° 207–208, August/September 1963).
 Alphaville ou Bêtafilm ? (Les Temps modernes n° 229, June 1965).
 Le vieil homme et l’enfant (Les Temps modernes n° 252, May 1967).

References

External links 
 Arlette Elkaïm-Sartre, sur France Culture

20th-century French philosophers
French women philosophers
Jean-Paul Sartre
Pieds-Noirs
People from Constantine, Algeria
1935 births
2016 deaths
Burials at Montparnasse Cemetery
20th-century French women
Signatories of the 1971 Manifesto of the 343